Banco do Nordeste is a Brazilian regional development bank headquartered in Fortaleza, Ceará. The bank was founded in 1952 and today has 300 bank branches and that allied to the work of the Development Agents and Agencies Travelers, allow the Bank to be present in about 2000  cities in all states of the Northeast region of Brazil and in the North region of states of Minas Gerais and Espírito Santo.

The bank is a financial institution organized under the form of mixed economy company, publicly traded, with over 90% of its capital under the control of the Federal Government and is the largest institution in Latin America focused on regional development.

Currently Banco do Nordeste is responsible for managing and implementing the Constitutional Fund for Financing the Northeast of Brazil, with resources of approximately R$15 billion reais.

Banco do Nordeste is responsible for the largest microfinance program in South America and second in Latin America, CrediAmigo, through which the Bank lends money to microentrepreneurs. It also operates the Program for Development of Tourism in the Northeast (Prodetur / NE), created to structure the tourism of the region.

References

External links
 Official Website

Companies based in Ceará
Banks of Brazil
Companies listed on B3 (stock exchange)
Government-owned companies of Brazil